Orthogonius mniszechi is a species of ground beetle in the subfamily Orthogoniinae. It was described by Maximilien Chaudoir in 1871.

References

mniszechi
Beetles described in 1871